The Stars Around Us is a 1970 paperback original anthology of previously published science fiction stories.

Contents
 "The Stars Around Us" by Robert Hoskins
 "The Peddler's Nose" (1951) by Jack Williamson
 "The Listeners" (1968) by James E. Gunn
 "Ghost Fleet" by Christopher Anvil
 "Fondly Fahrenheit" (1954) by Alfred Bester
 "With Redfern on Capella XII" (1955) by Frederik Pohl
 "Underfollow" (1963) by John Jakes
 "The Feeling of Power" (1958) by Isaac Asimov
 "The Helping Hand" (1950) by Poul Anderson
 "A Work of Art" (1956) by James Blish
 "The Great Slow Kings" (1963) by Roger Zelazny.

1970 short story collections
Science fiction anthologies
Signet Books books